The Blue Note Jazz Club is a jazz club and restaurant located at 131 West 3rd Street in Greenwich Village, New York City.  The club was opened on September 30, 1981, by owner and founder Danny Bensusan, with the Nat Adderley Quintet being the featured performers for the night.  The club's performance schedule features shows every evening at 8:00 pm and 10:30 pm and a Sunday jazz brunch with performances at 12:30 pm and 2:30 pm.  The venue has also started a bi-weekly Late Night Groove Series giving New York's up-and-coming jazz, soul, hip-hop, R&B and funk artists an opportunity to showcase their talents on Saturday and Sunday mornings at 12:30 am. The club has locations in Tokyo and Nagoya, Japan; Milan, Italy; Waikiki, Hawaii; Napa, California; Beijing, China; and São Paulo, Brazil.

History 
Bensusan's belief was "that if he brought big acts into a comfortable environment with great food, he could pack the house night after night." The Blue Note was soon established as New York City's premier jazz club, with Dizzy Gillespie, Sarah Vaughan, Carmen McRae, Lionel Hampton, Oscar Peterson and the Modern Jazz Quartet among prestigious regular performers there. Bensusan booked Ray Charles for a full week every year. The Blue Note is still considered one of the world's most famous jazz venues and one of the best known and most expensive in New York. Chick Corea, Keith Jarrett, Oscar Peterson, Dizzy Gillespie, and James Carter have all recorded live albums at the Blue Note.

Half Note Records 
Half Note Records is the Blue Note's live record label, founded in 2001. Numerous musicians have recorded live albums at the Blue Note and released them on this label, including James Carter, Avishai Cohen, Elvin Jones, Odean Pope, Charles Tolliver, Jeff "Tain" Watts, Kenny Werner, Arturo Sandoval, Kenny Garrett and others. Since its founding in 1998, the label has also expanded its scope to include studio releases, including McCoy Tyner's 2008 album Guitars and Kenny Werner's 2010 release, No Beginning, No End.

Festival 
On the 30th anniversary of its founding, the Blue Note Entertainment Group hosted the inaugural Blue Note Jazz Festival in June 2011, with more than 80 performances in 15 venues throughout New York City.  The annual, month-long event features artists who have been integral to the club's history, including Chris Botti, Dave Brubeck, McCoy Tyner, Nancy Wilson, and many others.

Gallery

References

External links

 Official website
 Blue Note Napa website

Jazz clubs in New York City
1981 establishments in New York City
Drinking establishments in Greenwich Village
Music venues completed in 1981